Yusofjerd (Romanized as Yūsofjerd; also known as Yūsofjerd-e Fe‘leh Gary) is a village in Bavaleh Rural District, in the Central District of Sonqor County, Kermanshah Province, Iran. At the 2006 census, its population was 474, in 108 families.

References 

Populated places in Sonqor County